Sceloporus poinsettii, the crevice spiny lizard, is a species of small, phrynosomatid lizard.

Etymology
The epithet, poinsettii, is in honor of American physician, botanist, and statesman, Joel Roberts Poinsett.

Geographic range
In the United States, Sceloporus poinsettii occurs in the Chihuahua Desert and Edwards Plateau regions of Texas and New Mexico. In Mexico it occurs in the border states from the Sierra Madre Occidental of Sonora, eastward through Chihuahua, Coahuila, and Nuevo Leon. Southward its distribution is less well established, although it is known to occur throughout of the state of Durango, parts of Zacatecas, with additional records from San Luis Potosi in the southeast, and the Pacific slopes of the Sierra Madre Occidental of northern Jalisco in the southwest.

Description
The crevice spiny lizard is typically grey in color, but sometimes can have a ruddy red-brown appearance with a black and white collar around the neck region. The underside is typically light grey, but males often have blue patches on either side of their bellies. The tail typically has black banding. Their scales have a distinctly spiny texture. They can grow to 11.8 cm (4.6 in) snout-to-vent length, and 31.1 cm (12.2 inches) total length.

Behavior

Crevice spiny lizards are typically shy and nervous, fleeing up a rock face or into a crevice if approached. They prefer semi-arid habitats, often of limestone rock, where there are numerous holes and easily accessible cracks.

Diet
Crevice spiny lizards are insectivorous, consuming a wide variety of spiders, beetles, and other insects, but they will sometimes also consume tender vegetation.

Reproduction
Sceloporus poinsettii is one of the several species of Sceloporus that are ovoviviparous. Breeding occurs in the spring, and a litter of up to 11 young are born in midsummer.

Subspecies
Five subspecies are recognized as being valid, including the nominotypical subspecies
Sceloporus poinsettii amydrus 
Sceloporus poinsettii axtelli 
Sceloporus poinsettii macrolepis 
Sceloporus poinsettii poinsettii 
Sceloporus poinsettii polylepis

References

Further reading
Baird, Spencer F., and Charles Girard (1852). "Characteristics of some New Reptiles in the Museum of the Smithsonian Institution". Proc. Acad. Nat. Sci. Philadelphia 6: 125-129. (Sceloporus poinsettii, new species, pp. 126–127).
Behler, John L., and F. Wayne King (1979). The Audubon Society Field Guide to North American Reptiles and Amphibians. New York: Alfred A. Knopf. 743 pp. . (Sceloporus poinsettii, pp. 527–528 + Plate 354).
Conant, Roger (1975). A Field Guide to Reptiles and Amphibians of Eastern and Central North America, Second Edition. Boston: Houghton Mifflin. xviii + 429 pp. + Plates 1-48.  (hardcover),  (paperback). (Sceloporus poinsettii, pp. 100–101 + Plate 17 + Map 66). 
Stebbins, Robert C. (2003). A Field Guide to Western Reptiles and Amphibians, Third Edition. Boston and New York: Houghton Mifflin. xiii + 533 pp. . (Sceloporus poinsettii, p. 285 + Plate 31 + Map 88).
Zim, Herbert S., and Hobart M. Smith (1956). Reptiles and Amphibians: A Guide to Familiar American Species: A Golden Nature Guide. New York: Simon and Schuster. 160 pp. (Sceloporus poinsetti, pp. 56, 155).

External links
Herps of Texas: Sceloporus poinsettii

Sceloporus
Reptiles of Mexico
Fauna of the Chihuahuan Desert
Reptiles of the United States
Reptiles described in 1852
Taxa named by Spencer Fullerton Baird
Taxa named by Charles Frédéric Girard